Bowbazar (also spelt Boubazar; formerly known as Bahubazar) is a neighbourhood of Central Kolkata, in Kolkata district in the Indian state of West Bengal.

History
On Lt. Col. Mark Wood's map of 1784, the portion of the eastward road from Lal Bazar to what was known for a long time as Circular Road - which ran along the filled-in Mahratta Ditch and is now Acharya Jagadish Chandra Bose Road - was shown as Boytaconnah Street, which received its name from the Baithakkana, or "resting place", where merchants formed and dispersed their caravans, sheltered by an old banyan tree (called a peepul tree in Cotton), at the road's eastern extremity.

Bow Bazar Street has been renamed Bepin Behari Ganguly Street (named after Bipin Behari Ganguli (1887–1954), revolutionary leader, who spent about 24 years in British Indian jails, later joining the Congress movement). However, the locality continues to be called Bow Bazar. In keeping with the neighbourhood's earliest name, a road stretching from B.B. Ganguly Street to MG Road is called Baithakkhana Road, as well as the market along the road at the easternmost part of B.B. Ganguly Street being called Baithakkhana Bazar.

At the cross roads where Lal Bazar, Bow Bazar, Chitpore Road and Bentinck Street meet was the place of execution, where the pillory was.

In 1888, one of the 25 newly organized police section houses was located in Bowbazar.

Geography

Police district
Bowbazar police station is part of the Central division of Kolkata Police. It is located at 13, Kapalitoalla Lane, Kolkata-700012.

Taltala Women police station covers all police districts under the jurisdiction of the Central division, i.e. Bowbazar, Burrabazar, Girish Park, Hare Street, Jorasanko, Muchipara, New Market, Taltala and Posta.

Red light district
Bowbazar has a red-light district where about 12,000 prostitutes work.

Transport
Bowbazar is in the administrative and commercial heart of the city.

Road
Chittaranjan Avenue (C.R. Avenue) and College Street-Nirmal Chandra Street pass through the area from north to south. Bepin Behari Ganguly Street (B.B. Ganguly Street) and Dr. Lalit Banerjee Sarani-Khirode Vidya Binode Avenue (New CIT Road) pass through the area from east to west. Many buses ply along these roads.

Train
Sealdah Station and B.B.D Bag railway station are the nearest railway stations of Bowbazar.

Economy
There are, as well, shops dealing in wooden furniture, musical instruments, shoes, seasonal fruits, fresh vegetables and meat, etc.

US-Bangla Airlines has its India offices in Bowbazar.

Bowbazar bomb blast incident
Mohammad Rashid Khan, a satta don, bombed Bowbazar on 16 March 1993, which killed 69 people. He and five of his associates were sentenced to life imprisonment.

Culture
Banga Natyalay, in nearby Pathuriaghata, was the first theatre to print admission cards in Bengali.

Traditionally, musical soirées were held in the large private houses of old Kolkata; but there also were some humbler houses that had similar soirées, amongst the latter being the Bowbazar home of a musical family, the Borals. The music maestro Jadu Bhatt, who gave musical lessons to the Tagores, died in Babu Ram Sil Lane, at the abode of the Adhikaris, which is also referred to as the Jhulan Bari. A festival of Indian classical music is still held there each year during Lord Krishna's festival of Jhulan Purnima.

Very old sweet shops, associated with the memories of Iswarchandra Vidyasagar and Sir Ashutosh Mukherjee, still exist in Bowbazar.

Gallery

See also
 Bowbazar (Vidhan Sabha constituency)

References

External links

Photos of Parsi Temple, Metcalfe Street (Bandook Gali)
Photos of Chinese Temple, Tiretta Bazar
Photos of Chinese New Year

Neighbourhoods in Kolkata
Culture of West Bengal
Red-light districts in India